The Swiss Athletics Championships is an annual outdoor track and field competition organised by the Swiss Athletics Federation, which serves as the national championships for the sport in Switzerland. The two-day event is typically held in mid-summer and the venue varies on an annual basis. It is open to adults of all ages and is thus referred to as the senior or élite championships.

The competition was initiated as a men-only event in 1906, with women's events being given national championship status in 1936.

Events
On the current programme a total of 38 individual Swiss Championship athletics events are contested, divided evenly between men and women. For each of the sexes, there are six track running events, three obstacle events, four jumps, four throws, a racewalk and a combined track and field event.

Track running
100 metres, 200 metres, 400 metres, 800 metres, 1500 metres, 5000 metres, 10,000 metres
Obstacle events
100 metres hurdles (women), 110 metres hurdles (men), 400 metres hurdles, 3000 metres steeplechase
Jumping events
Pole vault, high jump, long jump, triple jump
Throwing events
Shot put, discus throw, javelin throw, hammer throw
Walking events
10,000 metres race walk (men), 5000 metres race walk (women)
Combined events
Decathlon (men), heptathlon (women)

In addition to the main track and field championships, several other national championship events are held for road running (10K run, half marathon, marathon), racewalking (20 km walk, 50 km walk), cross country running (short and long course) and mountain running.

The women's programme was restricted in earlier years, compared to the men's. On the track, the 400 m was added in 1965, 1500 m in 1968, the 3000 m in 1972, the 10,000 m in 1986 and finally the 5000 m in 1995 (replacing the 3000 m event). The 400 m hurdles was added for women in 1977 and the steeplechase in 2007. The women's field programme was expanded in the 1990s, starting with triple jump in 1991, then hammer throw in 1995 and pole vault in 1996.

A men's 200 metres hurdles race was previously held, finishing in 1967. Women contested this event in 1970 and 1971.

Editions

Championships records

Men

Women

References

External links
Swiss Athletics official website

 
Recurring sporting events established in 1910
National athletics competitions
Athletics competitions in Switzerland
Athletics